Borów-Kolonia refers to the following places in Poland:

 Borów-Kolonia, Krasnystaw County
 Borów-Kolonia, Opole Lubelskie County